
Gmina Wąwolnica is a rural gmina (administrative district) in Puławy County, Lublin Voivodeship, in eastern Poland.

Villages
Gmina Wąwolnica contains the villages and settlements of Bartłomiejowice, Celejów, Grabówki, Huta, Karmanowice, Kębło, Łąki, Łopatki, Łopatki-Kolonia, Mareczki, Rąblów, Rogalów, Stanisławka, Wąwolnica, Zarzeka, Zawada and Zgórzyńskie.

Neighbouring gminas
Gmina Wąwolnica is bordered by the gminas of Karczmiska, Kazimierz Dolny, Końskowola, Kurów, Nałęczów, Poniatowa and Wojciechów.

References

Polish official population figures 2006

Wawolnica
Puławy County